Nvidia NVENC (short for Nvidia Encoder) is a feature in Nvidia graphics cards that performs video encoding, offloading this compute-intensive task from the CPU to a dedicated part of the GPU. It was introduced with the Kepler-based GeForce 600 series in March 2012.

The encoder is supported in many livestreaming and recording programs, such as vMix, Wirecast, Open Broadcaster Software (OBS) and Bandicam, as well as video editing apps, such as Adobe Premiere Pro or DaVinci Resolve. It also works with Share game capture, which is included in Nvidia's GeForce Experience software.

Consumer targeted GeForce graphics cards officially support no more than 3 simultaneously encoding video streams, regardless of the count of the cards installed, but this restriction can be circumvented on Linux and Windows systems by applying an unofficial patch to the drivers. Doing so also unlocks NVIDIA Frame Buffer Capture (NVFBC), a fast desktop capture API that uses the capabilities of the GPU and its driver to accelerate capture. Professional cards support between 3 and unrestricted simultaneous streams per card, depending on card model and compression quality.

Nvidia chips also feature an onboard decoder, NVDEC (short for Nvidia Decoder), to offload video decoding from the CPU to a dedicated part of the GPU.

Versions 
NVENC has undergone several hardware revisions since its introduction with the first Kepler GPU (GK104).

First generation, Kepler GK1xx
The first generation of NVENC, which is shared by all Kepler-based GPUs, supports H.264 high-profile (YUV420, I/P/B frames, CAVLC/CABAC), H.264 SVC Temporal Encode VCE, and Display Encode Mode (DEM).

NVidia's documentation states a peak encoder throughput of 8× realtime at a resolution of 1920×1080 (where the baseline "1×" equals 30Hz). Actual throughput varies on the selected preset, user-controlled parameters and settings, and the GPU/memory clock frequencies. The published 8× rating is achievable with the NVENC high-performance preset, which sacrifices compression efficiency and quality for encoder throughput. The high-quality preset is considerably slower but produces fewer compression artifacts

Second generation, Maxwell GM107
Introduced with the first-generation Maxwell architecture, second generation NVENC adds support for the high-performance HP444 profile (YUV4:4:4, predictive lossless encoding), and increases encoder throughput up to 16× realtime, which corresponds to about 1080p @ 480Hz with the high-performance preset.

Maxwell GM108 does not have NVENC hardware encoder support.

Third generation, Maxwell GM20x 
Introduced with the second-generation Maxwell architecture, third generation NVENC implements the video compression algorithm High Efficiency Video Coding (a.k.a. HEVC, H.265) and also increases the H.264 encoder's throughput to cover 4K-resolution at 60Hz (2160p60). However, it does not support B-frames for HEVC encoding (just I and P frames). The maximum NVENC HEVC coding tree unit (CU) size is 32 (the HEVC standard allows a maximum of 64), and its minimum CU size is 8.

HEVC encoding also lacks Sample Adaptive Offset (SAO). Adaptive quantization, look-ahead rate control, adaptive B-frames (H.264 only) and adaptive GOP features were added with the release of Nvidia Video Codec SDK 7. These features rely on CUDA cores for hardware acceleration.

SDK 7 supports two forms of adaptive quantization; Spatial AQ (H.264 and HEVC) and Temporal AQ (H.264 only).

Nvidia's consumer-grade (GeForce) cards and some of its lower-end professional Quadro cards are restricted to three simultaneous encoding jobs. Its higher-end Quadro cards do not have this restriction.

Fourth generation, Pascal GP10x
Fourth generation NVENC implements HEVC Main10 10-bit hardware encoding. It also doubles the encoding performance of 4K H.264 & HEVC when compared to previous generation NVENC. It supports HEVC 8K, 4:4:4 chroma subsampling, lossless encoding, and sample adaptive offset (SAO).

Nvidia Video Codec SDK 8 added Pascal exclusive Weighted Prediction feature (CUDA based). Weighted prediction is not supported if the encode session is configured with B frames (H.264).

There is no B-Frame support for HEVC encoding, and the maximum CU size is 32×32.

The NVIDIA GT 1030 and the Mobile Quadro P500 are GP108 chips that don't support the NVENC encoder.

In laptop graphics, NVIDIA MX Graphics do not include NVENC as they are based on a Maxwell-generation GM108 or a Pascal-generation GP108 chip. The GeForce MX350 is a GP107 chip whose NVENC encoder is disabled during manufacture.

Fifth generation, Volta GV10x/Turing TU117 
Volta NVENC has similar performance as Pascal's NVENC. 

It does not offer support for HEVC B-Frames.

In mobile graphics, as with most other GeForce MX-series graphics, the GeForce MX450 does not support NVENC as it is a TU117 chip whose hardware encoder is permanently disabled in its manufacture. The GeForce MX550, however, does support NVENC as its hardware encoder remains enabled at manufacturing level.

Sixth generation, Turing TU10x/TU116 
Sixth generation NVENC implements HEVC 8K encoding at 30 FPS, HEVC B-frames and HEVC B-frames as reference (with support for each and middle modes) and Alpha HEVC support and provides up to 25% bitrate savings for HEVC and up to 15% bitrate savings for H.264. The initial launch of the Nvidia GeForce GTX 1650 was exempt from this generation however, as it used Volta NVENC instead of Turing. Nvidia updated the NVENC encoder of the GTX 1650 cards in 2020 to also use the Turing engine. The GTX 1650 Super uses the Turing NVENC engine as it is based on the TU116 rather than the TU117 used in the original GTX 1650.

Seventh generation, Ampere GA10x 
Ampere has essentially the same NVENC generation engine as Turing. The only substantive difference is that NVDEC received support for AV1 decoding (with film grain).

In entry-level mobile graphics, the GA107-chip-based GeForce MX570 comes in two versions, one of which (the GeForce MX570 A) has the hardware decoder and encoder permanently disabled during manufacturing.

Eighth generation, Ada Lovelace AD10x 
Nvidia announced the next-gen NVENC with 8K 10-bit 60FPS AV1 fixed function hardware encoder in Ada Lovelace GPUs.

Operating system support 
The Nvidia NVENC SIP core needs to be supported by the device driver. The driver provides one or more interfaces, (e.g. OpenMAX IL) to NVENC. The NVENC SIP core can only be accessed through the proprietary NVENC API (as opposed to the open-source VDPAU API).

It is bundled with Nvidia's GeForce driver.

NVENC is available for Windows and Linux operating systems. The free and open-source nouveau device driver does not support Nvidia NVENC.

Application software support 
 Adobe Premiere Pro added NVENC support in version 14.2 in May 2020
 AJA Bridge Live
 Avidemux has supported NVENC since at least 2016, in H.264 or H.265
 Bandicut
 DaVinci Resolve Studio when exporting video in H.264 or H.265
 FFmpeg has supported NVENC since 2014, and is supported in Nvidia drivers
 HandBrake has supported NVENC since version 1.2.0 (December 2018), for H.264 and H.265
 HitFilm express/pro when previewing video on the timeline or exporting video in H.264 or H.265
 Jellyfin has support for NVENC for realtime transcoding
 Logitech Capture
 MacroSystem BogartSE supports NVENC export since v9.4 (October 2017) and UHD-Disc encoding since v11.3 (October 2019)
 MediaCoder
 Open Broadcaster Software (OBS)
 Shotcut
 StaxRip
 VideoProc

GPU throughput 
Comparison of Encode Throughput

See also 
 Intel Quick Sync Video, Intel's equivalent SIP core
 Video Coding Engine, AMD's equivalent SIP core till 2017
 Video Core Next, AMD's video core which combines the functionality of Video Coding Engine and Unified Video Decoder
Nvidia PureVideo, hardware video decoding
List of all Nvidia GPUs
Nvidia NVDEC

References

External links 
 NVIDIA VIDEO CODEC SDK
 NVENC Support Matrix

NVENC
Video acceleration
Video compression and decompression ASIC
Hardware acceleration